May Lake is a lake in Yosemite National Park, as well as a High Sierra Camp where backpackers can stay in tent cabins located near the lake. There are eight cabins that accommodate a total of thirty six guests. The lake is overlooked by Mount Hoffmann.

May Lake was named by Charles F. Hoffmann, for Lucy Mayotta ("May") Browne, who became his wife in 1870.

See also
List of lakes in California

References

External links
 
 Panorama of May Lake
 

Lakes of Mariposa County, California
Lakes of Yosemite National Park